Manoj Kumar (born 1937) is an Indian actor.

This name may also refer to:

 Manoj Kumar (chess player) (born 1977), Fijian chess player
 Manoj Kumar (politician) (born 1964), member of the 14th Lok Sabha of India
 Manoj Kumar (boxer) (born 1986), Indian boxer
 Manoj Kumar (Delhi politician), member of the Delhi Legislative Assembly from 2013
 Manoj Kumar (director), Tamil film director

See also
 Manchu Manoj (Manchu Manoj Kumar), Indian film actor
 Manoj (disambiguation)